Jones–Lee House is a historic home located at Greenville, Pitt County, North Carolina.  It was built in 1895, and is a two-story, "L"-plan, frame dwelling with Queen Anne style decorative elements.  It has an intersecting gable roof and one-story, gable roofed porch.  It features decorative shingles, curvilinear sawnwork, and applied half-timbering.

It was added to the National Register of Historic Places in 1980.

References

Houses on the National Register of Historic Places in North Carolina
Queen Anne architecture in North Carolina
Houses completed in 1895
Houses in Pitt County, North Carolina
National Register of Historic Places in Greenville, North Carolina